Campeonato Paulista Série A3 (also referred to as Paulistão A3 for short) is the third level of the São Paulo state professional football championship, one of the Brazilian state championships.

The tournament has been known as Série A3 since the 1993–94 season.

Structure 
The current format of the Paulistão A3 was introduced in 2018, after the number of teams was decreased from 20 to 16. Two teams are promoted to Série A2, and the bottom two teams are relegated to Campeonato Paulista Segunda Divisão.

First stage 
Each of the 16 competitors play each other once in the first stage of the competition, for a total of 15 matches between mid-January and early-April. A win earns three points and a draw earns one point. Teams are ranked by total points, then by total wins and finally by goal difference, number of scored goals, lower number of yellow and red cards taken. If teams are still level, a random draw is made to determine the final order in the standings. The 15th and 16th-placed teams are relegated to the state league fourth division.

Knockout phase 
The top 8 teams from the first stage qualify for the knockout phase. The knock-out ties are played in a two-legged format. The eight teams are seeded 1 to 8 according to their first stage table positions, The top seed team plays the eight-seeded, the second plays the seventh, the third plays the sixth and the fourth plays the fifth. The winning teams are then reseeded, taking into account their quarterfinals results.

In the semifinals, the highest-seeded team plays the lowest, and the other two winners from the previous round play each other. The winners of those contests win promotion to the Campeonato Paulista Série A2 and go on to face one another in the finals, which are also played in a two-legged format.

List of champions 

There are all the championship editions, officially recognized by Federação Paulista de Futebol.

Federations

Amateur Era (1919-1947)

APEA - Associação Paulista de Esportes Atléticos
LAF - Liga dos Amadores de Football
FPFA - Federação Paulista de Futebol Amador

Professional Era (1954-)

FPF - Federação Paulista de Futebol

Titles by club 

Names change

EC Vasco da Gama was changed the name to Americana EC.

Cities change

Oeste FC has moved from Itápolis to Barueri.
Red Bull Brasil has moved from Campinas to Bragança Paulista, due to the partnership between Red Bull and CA Bragantino (Red Bull Bragantino). Red Bull Brasil became the B team.

Teams promoted from Série A3

Relegated teams

São Bento were saved from relegation due to the withdrawal of Novorizontino in the 2nd level.

No teams were relegated due to the 2002 Torneio Rio-São Paulo.

Top scorers

See also
Campeonato Paulista
Campeonato Paulista Série A2
Campeonato Paulista Segunda Divisão
Campeonato Paulista Série B2
Campeonato Paulista Série B3
Federação Paulista de Futebol

External links
RSSSF Brasil

References

3